Buiratau National Park (Būiratau ūlttyq parkı) or Buyratau National Nature Park was created in 2011 to preserve a unique transitional zone between dry steppe and semi-arid forest ecosystems of the Kazakh Uplands of central Kazakhstan. The park is located in the Yereymentau Mountains, straddling the border of Yereymentau District of Akmola Region, and Sarybel District of Karaganda Region, and is about 60 km east of the capital city of Astana.

Topography
The area is dry steppe in the north, with more forest in the hills to the south and stands of alder and birch along the streams.  The relief is low ridges and hills of the Yereymentau Mountains, with inter-mountain plains.  There are many closed basins with very shallow (less than 1 meter) salt lakes; fresh groundwater can be found at depths of 1 – 17 meters. The largest lakes are Bozaigyr (Бозайгыр) and Azhybai (Ажыбай).

The park was formed by combining the original core reserve with the former Belodymov Zoological Park and the former Yereymentau Nature Reserve.

Climate
The climate is "Cold Semi-Arid Climate" (Köppen Classification BSk: warm, dry summers with cold winters.  280 mm of precipitation per year (maximum in summer).

Plants and animals
In addition to the relic forests, common plants of the area include scrub Siberian pea-tree (Caragana arborescens) and feather grass (Stipa).  Scientists have recorded over 450 species of vascular plants in the park, representing 20% of the species of the Central Kazakh Uplands.

The area is also known for Yereimantau Wild Sheep, supporting approximately 200 individuals.  45 species of mammals have been recorded in the area, and 227 species of birds.

Tourism
There are four tourist routes in the park; individual and group tours are offered in the summer.  A small admission fee is charged at the entrance.

References

External links

 Buiratau National Park on OpenStreetMap
 Bird-watching shelter at Azhybai lake

National parks of Kazakhstan
Geography of Akmola Region
Geography of Karaganda Region
Tourist attractions in Akmola Region
Tourist attractions in Karaganda Region